Samy Masselot (born 9 January 1989) is a French professional rugby league footballer who plays as a  or  forward for Villeneuve XIII RLLG in the Elite One Championship and France at international level.

Background
Masselot was born in Seclin, Nord, France.

Career
Masselot has represented French international.

Masselot previously played for Wakefield Trinity Wildcats in the Super League.

References

External links
Toulouse Olympique XIII profile

1989 births
Living people
French rugby league players
France national rugby league team players
Rugby league props
Rugby league second-rows
Toulouse Olympique players
Villeneuve Leopards players
Wakefield Trinity players